Dawid Dryja (born 21 July 1992) is a Polish professional volleyball player, a bronze medallist at the 2015 European League, and named the Best Middle Blocker of the tournament. At the professional club level, he plays for Jastrzębski Węgiel.

Career

Clubs
In 2011, he signed a contract with Asseco Resovia. He spent the 2012–13 season on a one–year loan in AZS Politechnika Warszawska. In the next season, he was sent on loan to Effector Kielce. In 2014, he came back to Asseco Resovia.

Honours

Clubs
 CEV Champions League
  2014/2015 – with Asseco Resovia
 National championships
 2014/2015  Polish Championship, with Asseco Resovia
 2021/2022  Polish SuperCup, with Jastrzębski Węgiel
 2022/2023  Polish SuperCup, with Jastrzębski Węgiel

Youth national team
 2009  European Youth Olympic Festival

References

External links

 
 Player profile at PlusLiga.pl 
 Player profile at Volleybox.net

Living people
1992 births
People from Jasło
Polish men's volleyball players
European Games competitors for Poland
Volleyball players at the 2015 European Games
Resovia (volleyball) players
Projekt Warsaw players
Effector Kielce players
MKS Będzin players
Czarni Radom players
Jastrzębski Węgiel players
Middle blockers